Costas Andreou is a musician and composer based in Athens, Greece. He processes the sounds of fretless electric bass in real time, creating multi-level soundscapes. He has written and performed the music and done the sound design for theatre performances and other artistic productions. His music has been used in various documentaries, films and television productions. His music is available to preview and download on his website.

His solo concert Live Ambient has been presented at Poli Theatre (Athens) on 10 October 2015, at Art Theatre Karolos Koun (Frinichou 14, Plaka) on 21 April 2016 and at Fournos Theatre (Mavromichali 168, Athens) on 15 December 2017, on 19 and 26 October 2018 and on 7 and 8 January 2019.

On 17 and 24 May 2019 he presented the concert Ippokratous at Fournos Theatre in Athens.

Music/sound design

Theatre
 Deirdre (William Butler Yeats)
 Youth Without God (Ödön von Horváth)
 The Burrow (Franz Kafka)
 An Unknown From The Seine (Ödön von Horváth)
 I Should Have (Franz Kafka)
 Woyzeck (Georg Büchner)
 "What Do You Say, Babis?" (Sakis Serefas)
 Riddance (Linda McLean)
 Leaves of Glass (Philip Ridley)
 Chroniques Des Jours Entiers, Des Nuits Entieres (Xavier Durringer)
 Places To Hide
 Children's Tales
 Blackbird (David Harrower)
 Sabbathland (Lena Kitsopoulou)
 The Small Things (Enda Walsh)
 L'Hereux Stratagème (Pierre de Marivaux)
 The Pillowman (Martin McDonagh)
 Amphitryon (Heinrich von Kleist)
 Tone Clusters (Joyce Carol Oates)
 The Mandate (Nikolai Erdmann)
 King John (William Shakespeare)
 Far Away (Caryl Churchill)
 Flirtations (Arthur Schnitzler)
 City in a State of Emergency (Aghelliki Darlassi)
 Mr Ouatson would like some more snow (Giannis Dumos)
 Tabataba (Bernard-Marie Koltès)

Film, documentaries
 Exploro
 Meridian
 The Navigator
 In The Wind
 Clementine
 Aerostat
 Devotion
 Southern Skies
 Moment of Torsion
 Kinetic
 Uptown
 Indirect Fire
 Easter Island
 Netrino
 Bella
 No Relation
 Behind A Cloud
 Walls Are Dancing
 Acquisition
 Red Chamber
 Sophia Girl
 Airborne

multimedia, audiovisual
 Flavescent
 Radioscopic
 Restless
 Spectrum
 Geo

Discography

Solo albums
 Observation Point (2017)
 Blind Journeys at Sea (2011)
 Dolphin Dreams (2006)
 Transpacific EP (2005)

Collaborations
 Per Boysen & Costas Andreou – Nanetora (2008)

External links
costasandreou.com – official website.

References

 Ippokratous information about the concert
 Live Ambient information about the concert
 Vicky Georgiadou theatre productions directed by Vicky Georgiadou
 Pulsar theatre group theatre productions

Interviews
 Costas Andreou in fretless pathways on a rich musical journey!
 Costas Andreou: music improvisation and other stories
 Costas Andreou: I am interested in stimulating the audience's mind to create images
 Costas Andreou: Fretless electric bass is the instrument with which I express myself, it's a companion
 Costas Andreou: Every concert is a different journey that we take together
 Costas Andreou: Fretless electric bass has a lot in common with the human voice

Year of birth missing (living people)
Living people
Musicians from Athens
Greek composers
Ambient musicians
Greek electronic musicians
Theatre in Greece
Greek bass guitarists
Alternative rock bass guitarists
Male film score composers
Minimalist composers